Hindeoceras is a genus of nautilids from the middle Devonian of North America, included in the tainoceratacean family Rutoceratidae.

The shell of Hindioceras is described as 
large, gyroconic, with about 2 volutions, whorls being barely in contact. The inner margin or dorsum is broadly flattened to slightly concave, sides well rounded, the outer margin or venter arched. The surface is covered with nodes or spines in a regular rhythmic pattern. the siphuncle is near the venter, tubular, without organic deposits.   There is a well developed hyponomic sinus for the hydro-jet or hyponome on ventral side of the aperture.

References

 Bernhard Kummel, 1964. Nautiloidea-Natilida. Treatise on Invertebrate Paleontology, Part K. Geological Society of America.
 Hindeoceras in Fossilworks Gateway.

Prehistoric nautiloid genera